"Anywhere Is" is a song by Irish singer Enya, released on 6 November 1995 as the lead single from her fourth studio album, The Memory of Trees (1995). The lyrics of the song are in English, written by Roma Ryan and it was produced by Nicky Ryan. The song peaked at number seven on the UK Singles Chart and became a top-10 hit in Austria, Iceland, Ireland, and Scotland. On the Eurochart Hot 100, the song peaked at number 36. Its music video was directed by David Scheinmann.

Background
"Anywhere Is" developed from a staccato line that Enya has described had a "march feel". Initially it was a track that she and producer Nicky Ryan wanted to reject for the album The Memory of Trees. But it was developed further after Rob Dickins, then chairman of Warner Music UK who had signed Enya, was invited to Ireland in August 1995 to listen to the album, roughly one year-and-a-half into the recording process. It was only its backing tracks that had been put down, but Dickins sensed the song had the makings of a hit single and encouraged them to complete it; it was the final track of the new album to be worked on. Enya's melody for the song inspired Roma Ryan to write lyrics about, as Billboard magazine put it, "the search for the temporal heaven all cultures call 'home'", a subject that Enya felt was important as she only writes and rehearses her songs in Ireland. Dickins received a dedication on the album's sleeve in Gaelic.

Chart performance
"Anywhere Is" entered the UK Singles Chart at number 12 on 12 November 1995 and peaked at number seven the next week. It was also a top-10 hit in Austria (8), Iceland (3), Ireland (8) and Scotland (8), and a top-20 hit in Poland and the Netherlands (19). On the Eurochart Hot 100, "Anywhere Is" reached number 36 on 16 December. Outside Europe, the song peaked at number 34 in Australia and number 62 in Canada. It received a silver record in the United Kingdom, shipping over 200,000 units.

Critical reception
AllMusic editor Rick Anderson constated that Enya has "a truly lovely voice", and added that there's no point trying to resist the "incantatory power" of "Anywhere Is". Larry Flick from Billboard described the song as "an exhilarating uptempo pop waltz that will turn any car, den, or front stoop into an otherworldly tabernacle of sound." He complimented the singer for her "remarkable ability to inspire listeners is undiminished on this richly layered feast of melody-a throbbing secular hymn about life's search for fulfillment." A reviewer from Crawley News wrote that the song "sounds fabulous". James Masterton for Dotmusic felt that it's "if anything slightly more commercial than many of her previous hits, with a light, almost poppy sound." Dave Sholin from the Gavin Report found that "Enya has developed a truly distinctive style. Those of us who became fans early on love to convert the unitiated, and this song is bound to bring many more into the flock. Count on another magnificent video to accompany this very commercial track." 

British magazine Music Week gave "Anywhere Is" it five out of five and named it Single of the Week, adding, "Back with a vengeance, Enya's meanderings are given a jauntier air, with the familiar building chorus forming a strong hook." Michelle Boucher from The Observer complimented the song for having "a nice rhythm". Steven Johnson from The Record remarked its "spirited melody", that is the furthest away from her usual "tried-and-true" musical formula. Toledo Blades reviewer described it as "positively upbeat". Mike Joyce from The Washington Post felt the song "highlight Enya's often overlooked pop sensibility", "with its wondrously spun harmonies, swiftly revolving melody and resonating backbeat".

Music video
The accompanying music video for "Anywhere Is" was directed by David Scheinmann.

Track listings

Charts and certifications

Weekly charts

Year-end charts

Certifications

Release history

References

External links
 

1995 singles
1995 songs
Enya songs
Reprise Records singles
Songs with lyrics by Roma Ryan
Songs with music by Enya
Warner Music Group singles